The Big Ten Conference Freshman of the Year is a college softball award given to the Big Ten Conference's most outstanding freshman. The award has been given annually since 1985.

Winners

Winners by school

References

Awards established in 1985
Freshman
NCAA Division I softball conference freshmen of the year